Port Phillip, sometimes referred to as Port Phillip Bay, is a large bay in southern Victoria, Australia, 1,930 km² (476,900 acres) in area, with a coastline length of . The bay is extremely shallow for its size, but mostly navigable. The deepest portion is only 24 m (80 ft), and half the region is shallower than 8 m. Its volume is around 25 km³. The city of Melbourne is located at its northern end, near the mouth of the Yarra River.

Port Phillip is home to a vast array of geographic features typically found in bays, such as beaches, points, islands and smaller bays, as well as being the drainage point of many major rivers and creeks in Central Victoria. All features here are listed clockwise from the mouth of the Yarra River.

Beaches

Port Phillip hosts many beaches, most of which are flat, shallow and long, with very small breaks making swimming quite safe. This attracts many tourists, mostly families, to the beaches of Port Phillip during the summer months and school holidays. Water sports such as body boarding and surfing are difficult or impossible, except in extreme weather conditions. Most sandy beaches are located on the bay's northern, eastern and southern shorelines, while the western shorelines host a few sandy beaches, there mostly exists a greater variety of beaches, swampy wetlands and mangroves. The occasional pebble beach and rocky cliffs can also be found, mostly in the southern reaches. Major beaches include:

St Kilda Beach - St Kilda
Middle Brighton Beach - Brighton
Sandringham Beach - Sandringham
Ricketts Point/Watkins Bay - Beaumaris
Mentone Beach - Mentone
Carrum Beach - Carrum
Seaford Beach - Seaford
Frankston Beach - Frankston
Mothers Beach - Mornington
Safety Beach - Safety Beach
Dromana Beach - Dromana
Rosebud Beach - Rosebud
Rye Beach - Rye
Sorrento Front Beach - Sorrento
Portsea Front Beach - Portsea
Queenscliff Beach - Queenscliff
Eastern Beach - Geelong
Rippleside Beach - Rippleside
Werribee South Beach - Werribee South
Altona Beach - Altona
Seaholme Beach - Seaholme
Williamstown Beach - Williamstown

Landforms

Islands and reefs
Long Island
Wooleys Reef
Pelican Point Reef
Hovell Pile
South Channel Pile (artificial)
South Channel Fort
Mud Islands
Pope's Eye (incomplete fort)
Chinaman's Hat (artificial)
Nepean Reef
Sand Island
Swan Island
Stingaree Island
Mangrove Island
Rabbit Island
Tip Island
Duck Island
West Channel Pile
Mudlands
Great Sand
Middle Ground
South Sand
Popes Eye Bank
Middle Sand
William Sand
West Sand

Points

Point Ormond
Green Point
Picnic Point (Sandringham)
Red Bluff
Quiet Corner
Ricketts Point
Table Rock Point
Olivers Hill
Pelican Point
Shnapper Point (Mornington)
Linley Point
Balcombe Point
Martha Point (Mount Martha)
Anthonys Nose (Dromana)
White Cliffs
Eastern Sister 
Western Sister
Policemans Point (Sorrento)
Point King 
Point McArthur
Point Franklin (Portsea)
Police Point
Observatory Point
Point Nepean
The Rip
Point Lonsdale
Shortlands Bluff (Queenscliff)
The Cut
Swan Point (Swan Island)
Burnt Point
Edwards Point
The Bluff
Indented Head
Point George
Grassy Point
Point Richards (Portarlington)
Beacon Point
Point Henry
Limeburners Point
Point Lillias
Point Wilson
Kirk Point
Point Cooke
Point Gellibrand (Williamstown)

Bays

Hobsons Bay
Greenwich Bay
Beacon Cove
Elwood Bay
Hampton Bay
Half Moon Bay (Black Rock)
Watkins Bay
Beaumaris Bay
Keefers Cove
Daveys Bay
Canadian Bay
Half Moon Bay (Mount Eliza)
Mornington Bay
Marina Cover
Dromana Bay
Pebble Cove
Martha Cove
Capel Sound
Camerons Bight
Sullivan Bay
Sorrento Bay
Collins Bay
Weeroona Bay
Ticonderoga Bay
Nepean Bay
The Bend
The Rip
Lonsdale Bay
Stingaree Bight
Swan Bay (very shallow at low tide)
Salt Lagoon
Hood Bight
Half Moon Bay (Indented Head)
Outer Harbour
Corio Bay
Stingaree Bay
Steampacket Quay
Corio Quay
Limeburners Bay
The Spit
Campbells Cove
Altona Bay
Shelley Bay

Confluents
Yarra River - Newport/Port Melbourne
Maribyrnong River
Sandridge Lagoon (now filled in) - Port Melbourne
Elster Creek - Elwood
Mordialloc Creek - Mordialloc
Patterson River - Carrum
Kananook Creek - Frankston
Sweetwater Creek - Frankston South
Kackeraboite Creek - Mount Eliza
Ballar Creek - Mount Eliza
Earimil Creek - Mount Eliza
Gunyong Creek - Mount Eliza
Manmangur Creek - Mount Eliza
Caraar Creek - Mornington
Tanti Creek - Mornington
Balcombe Creek - Mount Martha
Hearn Creek - Mount Martha
Tassells Creek - Safety Beach
Dunns Creek - Safety Beach
Sheepwash Creek - Safety Beach
Coburn Creek - McCrae
Chinamans Creek - Rosebud West
The Rip
Yarram Creek - Swan Bay
Frederick Mason Creek - St Leonards
St Leonards Creek - St Leonards
Cowies Creek - North Geelong
Cuthbertson Creek - North Shore
Hovells Creek - Corio
Little River - Point Wilson
Werribee River - Cocoroc/Werribee South
Skeleton Creek - Point Cook
Laverton Creek - Altona
Cherry Creek - Seaholme
Kororoit Creek - Williamstown North

Other features
Portsea Hole

Marine Parks
Port Phillip Heads Marine National Park

References

Port Phillip, Geography
Port Phillip